The 2021 Kansas Lottery 300 was a NASCAR Xfinity Series race that was held on October 23, 2021, at the Kansas Speedway in Kansas City, Kansas. Contested over 200 laps on the  oval, it was the 31st race of the 2021 NASCAR Xfinity Series season, the fifth race of the Playoffs, and the second race of the Round of 8. Joe Gibbs Racing driver Ty Gibbs collected his fourth win of the season.

Report

Background 

Kansas Speedway is a 1.5-mile (2.4 km) tri-oval race track in Kansas City, Kansas. It was built in 2001, and it currently hosts two annual NASCAR race weekends. The IndyCar Series also held races at the venue until 2011. The speedway is owned and operated by the International Speedway Corporation.

Entry list 

 (R) denotes rookie driver.
 (i) denotes driver who is ineligible for series driver points.

Qualifying
Daniel Hemric was awarded the pole for the race as determined by competition-based formula. Timmy Hill did not have enough points to qualify for the race.

Starting Lineups

Race

Race results

Stage Results 
Stage One
Laps: 45

Stage Two
Laps: 45

Final Stage Results 

Laps:

Race statistics 

 Lead changes: 19 among 6 different drivers
 Cautions/Laps: 10 for 46
 Time of race: 2 hours, 39 minutes, and 48 seconds
 Average speed:

References 

NASCAR races at Kansas Speedway
2021 NASCAR Xfinity Series
2021 in sports in Kansas
Kansas Lottery 300